Étienne Schmit (22 October 1889 – 19 December 1937) was a Luxembourgian politician and jurist.  He served in the Chamber of Deputies, and in the governments of Pierre Prüm (1925–1926), Joseph Bech (1932–1937), and Pierre Dupong (1937).  He died in office, when he was Minister for Transport.  Schmit also sat in the communal council of Luxembourg City (1929–1931).

|-

|-

|-

1886 births
1937 deaths
People from Rambrouch
Liberal League (Luxembourg) politicians
Radical Liberal Party (Luxembourg) politicians
Ministers for Finances of Luxembourg
Ministers for Public Works of Luxembourg
Ministers for Justice of Luxembourg
Ministers for Transport of Luxembourg
Members of the Chamber of Deputies (Luxembourg)
Councillors in Luxembourg City
Luxembourgian jurists